is a theme park and film set modeled after the Edo period located in Kyoto, Japan that opened its doors in 1975. It is situated in Toei Company's Kyoto Studio where movies have been produced.

Projects filmed at the park include Sebastiano Serafini's historical Japan-themed music video for the single "Inori".

References

External links

Toei Kyoto Studio Park
STUDIO AREA (KYOTO)  TOEI COMPANY PROFILE

Tourist attractions in Kyoto
Amusement parks in Japan
Toei Company